Kushanabha is a king featured in Hindu texts. He is described to be the king of the Amavasu dynasty and belongs to the Chandravamsha line. He is stated to be the son of Kusha. Kushanabha is believed to be the founder of the city Mahodaya (Regarded to be present-day Kannauj).

Legend

Marriage
Gritachi was an accomplished dancer. Kushanabha was infatuated with her after seeing her dance. He married her and had 100 daughters with her.

Birth of Gadhi
Kushanabha had 100 daughters but no male successor to his throne. So, he started worshipping the deity Indra and performed austerities wishing to have a son like Indra. At last, Indra consented and became his son, by incarnation, being born as Gadhi.

References

Characters in the Ramayana
Mahabharata